Joseph Obey Joyce (born 19 September 1985) is a British professional boxer. He has held the WBO interim heavyweight title since 2022. At regional level, he has held multiple heavyweight championships, including the Commonwealth title twice between 2018 and 2021; the British title from 2020 to 2022; and the European title from 2020 to 2021. As an amateur, he won a bronze medal at the 2013 European Championships; gold at the 2014 Commonwealth and 2015 European Games; bronze at the 2015 World Championships; and silver at the 2016 Olympics. 

As of October 2022, he is ranked as the world's second-best active heavyweight by the Transnational Boxing Rankings Board, fourth by The Ring magazine, and sixth by ESPN and BoxRec. He is known for his exceptional punching power, relentless pace, and granite chin, and currently holds a 93% knockout-to-win percentage, having won all fights but one by stoppage.

Early life 
Born to a Scottish-born Irish father and a mother of Nigerian origin, Joyce grew up in London and studied at Elliott School, based in Putney. He took up boxing at the age of 22, having his interest in track and field athletics curtailed by injuries, and joined Earlsfield ABC, based in Earlsfield, London. Joyce is on record saying ‘I don’t really like boxing, but I enjoy doing it’, highlighting the fact that he was not a big boxing fan growing up, and only started watching some of the greats after getting into boxing properly.

Joyce obtained a BSc degree in Fine Arts at Middlesex University in 2009; he graduated with Upper Second Class Honours. In 2017, Joyce has displays with the Art of the Olympians.

Amateur career
Joyce won the super heavyweight class at the 2012 ABA Championships and 2012 GB Amateur Boxing Championships. He won the bronze in his class at the 2013 European Amateur Boxing Championships after getting KO'd by defending Russian champion Sergei Kuzmin in the semifinal.

He competed in the men's super heavyweight division at the 2014 Commonwealth Games where he won the gold medal. He also won the title at the 2015 European Games in Baku.

He had success during 2015 and 2016 in the World Series of Boxing, and in April 2016 won a gold medal at the European Olympic trials to qualify for the Olympics. On 21 August 2016 Joyce won the silver medal in the super heavyweight class at the 2016 Summer Olympics, losing in the final, via a controversial split decision to Tony Yoka of France. It was the final medal won by Team GB at the Olympics.

Professional career

Early career 
Joyce turned professional in July 2017 at the age of 31, signing with Hayemaker Ringstar. On 6 September 2017, an official announcement was made for the first boxing event which would take place at Indigo, The O2 arena in London on 20 October 2017. Haye confirmed that Joyce would headline the card, making his debut against experienced former WBO Asia Pacific champion Ian Lewison (12-3, 8 KOs). Joyce put on an impressive display in a hard earned victory. Promoter David Haye spoke to Metro after the bout stating he offered British heavyweight champion Sam Sexton a career-high payday to fight Joyce next, but hadn't heard anything back. He also offered David Allen a fight, who turned it down to rematch Lenroy Thomas. Haye hoped to get Joyce back in action on the undercard of his rematch with Tony Bellew in December 2017.

On 2 November, Joyce confirmed that he would fight on the Tony Bellew vs. David Haye II undercard on 17 December. Two days later, British boxer Tom Little (10-4, 3 KOs) was announced as his opponent. The event was rescheduled to 5 May 2018. On 30 January 2018, Hayemaker Ringstar announced that Joyce would make his next appearance at the York Hall in London on 16 February against 25 year old Croatian boxer Rudolf Jozic (4-1, 3 KOs). On 3 February, whilst backstage at the O2 Arena in London for Lawrence Okolie vs. Isaac Chamberlain, Derek Chisora met with Haye and Joyce, where Chisora revealed Haye had contacted his manager Steve Goodwin and offered £60,000 for him to fight Joyce. Chisora later stated if the money was right, he would fight Joyce on the Tony Bellew vs. David Haye II card on 5 May 2018. Joyce knocked out Jozic in the first round after landing a right hand to the head towards the end of the round. When the result was announced, the timekeeper included the 10-count, announcing the time of stoppage as 3 minutes and 6 seconds. After the fight, Haye stated a new six-figure offer would be presented to Chisora, which would see him earn around the same purse he received in his loss to Agit Kabayel.

On 1 March, speaking ahead of his next fight at the York Hall on 17 March against Donnie Palmer, Joyce stated that Chisora had rejected the offer to fight him. Joyce knocked Palmer out inside the first minute of round one at the O2 Arena. On 24 March, after Chisora knocked out his French opponent Zakaria Azzouzi and then called Joyce and Haye over during his post fight interview with Sky Sports. Prior to calling them over, Chisora referred to Joyce as a Chihuahua. Chisora first asked Haye if he had confidence in Joyce and then stated, "In front of the British public on live television, I’ll make a deal with you right now: if he (Joyce) beats me you write me a cheque of £1, if I beat him you give me your purse against Tony (Bellew) and your TV rights." Haye rejected the offer. Chisora then told Haye to not mention his name again. Haye told Sky Sports, "We offered him the same money he got for (Kubrat) Pulev, more money than he got for the European title, but you said no. Okay, we understand."

Domestic success 
On 16 April 2018, it was announced a deal was in place for Joyce to challenge for the Commonwealth heavyweight title against Jamaican boxer Lenroy Thomas (22-4-1, 10 KOs). Two days later, Sky Sports officially announced the fight for 5 May. Joyce entered the ring wearing a sombrero. He knocked Thomas down three times before the fight came to an end in round 2. Two knockdowns came from body shots and the final knockdown came from a left hook to the head.. After the fight, Joyce stated he would like to challenge for the British heavyweight title. By winning the belt in just his fourth professional bout, Joyce broke a 106-year record.

On 21 May, it was announced that Joyce would make a first defence of his Commonwealth title on 15 June at the York Hall in London, live and exclusive on Dave. On 8 June, Ghanaian boxer Richard Lartey (12-1, 9 KOs) was confirmed as Joyce's opponent. A day before the fight, Lartey was replaced by Croatian journeyman Ivica Bacurin (29-13-1, 18 KOs). In a non-title fight, Joyce knocked Bacurin out in less than two minutes. After the fight, there was talks around a potential fight with British champion Hughie Fury. On 18 June, Joyce said he was open to fighting American heavyweight Bryant Jennings (23-2, 13 KOs) on 18 August 2018 in New Jersey. Jennings was initially in talks to fight former WBO champion Joseph Parker on the same date, however Parker opted to fight Dillian Whyte on 28 July.

After Kell Brook suffered an ankle injury and ruled himself out of the Whyte-Parker PPV card, there was rumours that Joyce would fight domestic rival Nick Webb on the undercard. Joyce quickly denied the reports and stated he had no intention in fighting in July. He also stated he had parted ways with trainer Ismail Salas after Salas had announced himself semi-retired and moved to Doha, Qatar.

Signing with Al Haymon
On 24 July 2018, Joyce started a one month trial with world-renowned trainer Abel Sanchez. Seven days later Joyce and Sanchez reached a deal to team up full time. On 15 August, Joyce signed a deal with powerful American advisor Al Haymon. It was said that Joyce would make his US debut before the end of 2018. On 4 September, it was announced that Joyce would fight Iago Kiladze (26-3, 18 KOs) in an 8-round bout at the Citizens Business Bank Arena in Ontario, California, on 30 September. Joyce kept his unbeaten run alive with a fifth round knockout win over Kiladze. Joyce knocked Kiladze down three times in dropping him in rounds 2, 3 and 5. The fight was stopped after the third knockdown with Kiladze appearing hurt. The official time of the stoppage was at 41 seconds of the round. Kiladze didn't appear to cause any damage with the shots he landed and Joyce appeared to use his jab more.

Joyce vs. Hanks 
After being listed as a next possible opponent for Joyce, former world title challenger Gerald Washington (19-2-1, 12 KOs) welcomed the bout, which was likely to take place on the Deontay Wilder vs. Tyson Fury Showtime PPV undercard on 1 December 2018. Joyce spent the next few weeks as one of Fury's sparring partners. On 30 October, it was revealed that Joyce would fight returning American boxer Joe Hanks (23-2, 15 KOs) on the Wilder-Fury card at the Staples Center in Los Angeles, California. Joyce weighed 262 pounds compared to Hanks' 247 ½ pounds. It was reported by the CSAC, Joyce would make $40,000 and Hanks would take home $50,000. Joyce put on an impressive performance in knocking out Hanks in the first round of their scheduled 10 round bout. Hanks had his moments earlier in the round. He landed several clean shots that made Joyce take a few steps back. Joyce came back and hurt Hanks with right hands. Joyce then landed a hard left to the head, knocking Hanks down. Hanks managed to beat referee Jerry Cantu's count; however, the fight was waved off. The time of stoppage was 2 minutes and 25 seconds of round one, awarding Joyce the vacant WBA Continental heavyweight title. In the post-fight presser, Joyce called out Luis Ortiz, also stating he was ready for bigger challenges. Ortiz accepted, claiming he does not turn down a challenge.

Joyce vs. Stiverne 
On 23 January 2019, PBC announced Joyce would return to the UK and fight former world titleholder Bermane Stiverne (25-3-1, 21 KOs) on the James DeGale-Chris Eubank Jr. PPV undercard on 23 February 2019 at The O2 Arena in London. Joyce explained the fight was made after Stiverne made comments about "taking Joyce to school", when they sparred previously. Stiverne explained he felt insulted that Joyce, who had only 7 professional bouts under his belt, wanted to fight him. Before the fight, Joyce stated he would not be finishing the fight in round 1, as he 'was not there yet', but predicted he would take Stiverne out by round 8. Stiverne came into this fight at 273 pounds. Joyce kept his knockout streak alive by finishing Stiverne in round 6 of their scheduled 12 round bout. Both boxers started the fight aggressively throwing punches. By round 2, Joyce began landing shots which wobbled Stiverne. With his guard no longer high, Stiverne stayed on his feet and finished the round. in round 3, Joyce landed a big right hand, which sent Stiverne into the ropes, forcing the referee to make a 10-count. Stiverne recovered and managed to get through the next couple of rounds due to Joyce slowing down his pace. The end came when Joyce trapped Stiverne against the ropes in round 6 and landed two right hands, forcing referee Howard Foster to stop the action. Stiverne had no complaints with the stoppage and walked slowly back to his corner. After the bout, Joyce's co-promoter Richard Schaefer said Joyce would likely return on Wilder's undercard in May and then look to challenge for the WBA 'Regular' title later in the year. With the win, Joyce retained the Commonwealth belt and won the vacant WBA Gold heavyweight title.

In March 2019, Joyce became the mandatory challenger for European heavyweight champion Agit Kabayel. Joyce also became linked with fighting British prospect Daniel Dubois for the vacant British heavyweight title, with Frank Warren also stating he had no issued with making the fight happen. On 17 April 2019, Joyce revealed he had split with trainer Abel Sanchez, having moved back to UK to train with Adam Booth in London.

Signing with Queensberry

Joyce vs. Ustinov 
On 25 April 2019, Joyce signed with Frank Warren's Queensberry Promotions to co-promote him, alongside Ringstar Sports. It was announced Joyce would return to the ring on the undercard of Billy Joe Saunders vs. Shefat Isufi on 18 May at the Lamex Stadium in Stevenage, England. On 2 May, 42 year old Russian boxer Alexander Ustinov (34-3, 25 KOs) was announced as Joyce's opponent, subject to a visa. Joyce explained he could have waited for a bigger fight in July, but wanted to stay busy instead, not fighting another journeyman. Joyce won the fight via TKO in round 3. In round 1, Joyce started off picking his shots behind the jab. Ustinov also managed to land a small number of shots, which had no impact on Joyce. Joyce increased his output in round 2, putting pressure on Ustinov, who did not land very much and began holding on. By the end of round 2, Ustinov was on unsteady legs. Both boxers started round 3 trading, with both landing clean shots. Joyce being more active, was throwing with both hands and managed to land a clean left hand to Ustinov's head, dropping him near the ropes. Ustinov slowly tried to beat the count, but was unable to, and counted out. Joyce said after the fight backstage, "The proof's in the pudding. You tell Eddie, you know, winning this fight like that, before Hunter, proves to the world, and to Eddie, that I am a credible opponent [for Joshua]." Joyce felt the win would help him get a world title opportunity by the end of 2019.

Joyce vs. Jennings 
Joyce would next be scheduled to fight at The O2 Arena in London, on 13 July 2019, on the Daniel Dubois vs. Nathan Gorman: Heavy Duty card. On 22 May, Joyce's manager Sam Jones revealed that he was unable to agree a deal with Alexander Povetkin, Joseph Parker, Derek Chisora and Agit Kabayel to fight Joyce in July. He stated he would now look at the likes of Éric Molina, Bryant Jennings and Chris Arreola. A day later, Jennings came out as being the favourite to fight Joyce. Jennings teased the announcement via his social media, when he tagged "Grind 7/13 O2 Arena", under a video segment of him working out. Sam Jones replied to the tweet, "He's going to need more than a vegan diet and a six-pack to deal with Joe." On the night, Joyce was taken the full distance for the first time in his career, winning a unanimous decision with scores of 118-109, 117-110 and 115-112, with the irregular scores due to Jennings being deducted a point for a low blow.

Joyce vs. Wallisch 
Over a year later, Joyce returned to the ring on 25 July 2020 against Michael Wallisch in a behind-closed-doors bout in Stratford. After knocking Wallisch down three times in the first three rounds, the referee stopped the fight resulting in a third-round technical knockout victory for Joyce.

Joyce vs. Dubois 
On 28 November 2020, Joyce fought undefeated prospect Daniel Dubois in Church House in London. This was a highly anticipated domestic match-up that had big implications for future world title hopes as both fighters came in undefeated, with the British, Commonwealth, European, WBC Silver and WBO International heavyweight titles on the line. In a competitive fight, it was the jab of Joyce that made the biggest difference swelling the eye of Dubois from the second round and closing the eye by the tenth round. Dubois was unable to continue in the tenth round: he pawed at his swollen left eye and voluntarily went down on one knee taking a ten count from the referee, before being counted out. In an upset victory, Joyce was declared the winner by tenth-round knockout. In his post-fight interview, Joyce declared, "I'm ready for [the WBO's #1 ranked heavyweight] Oleksandr Usyk. Daniel has got some power but I've felt power like that before. With my experience I've learnt to ride them."

Joyce vs. Takam 
On 16 June 2021, it was announced that Joyce's next fight would be against former world title challenger Carlos Takam on 24 July at the SSE Arena. After a slow start from Joyce on the night, in which Takam landed numerous punches to the head and body of Joyce in the opening rounds, Joyce staggered his opponent at the start of the sixth round, overwhelming him with a barrage of punches and forcing referee Steve Gray to halt the fight. The official result was a sixth-round technical knockout victory for Joyce. In his post-fight interview, he named the two opponents that he would be interested in facing next: "What I want is AJ or [Oleksandr] Usyk."

Joyce vs. Hammer 
Joyce's next fight would also take place at the SSE Arena, almost one year later on 2 July 2022 against Christian Hammer. He knocked Hammer to the canvas multiple times, before finally finishing off his opponent with a left hook to the body in the fourth round. After the fight, Joyce asserted, "I'm top level ready for the world stage. I'm ready for all comers and I'm looking to fight the winner of AJ-Usyk, maybe Tyson Fury. I'm at that level."

WBO interim heavyweight champion

Joyce vs. Parker 
On 24 September 2022, Joyce headlined a BT Sport Box Office pay-per-view show against former WBO champion Joseph Parker at the AO Arena in Manchester, England, in a fight between the WBO's number 1 and 2 contenders for the vacant interim title. In a fast-paced bout in which both men landed power punches, Joyce was able to bloody Parker's nose and open a cut above his eye, fighting largely on the front foot and using his jab to set up his attacks, while Parker was able to work off the back foot, finding some success with the left hook and overhand right. In the eleventh round, Joyce knocked his opponent down with a powerful left hook. Parker was able to rise to his feet, but the referee deemed it unsafe for him to continue, halting the fight to declare Joyce the winner by eleventh-round knockout. With the result, Joyce became the first man to stop Parker, who had previously never been knocked out. Joyce made it clear that he wanted to face the full WBO champion next, saying, "[Oleksandr] Usyk, let's get it on."

Joyce vs. Zhang 

On 2 February 2023, it was officially announced that Joyce would be making the first defence of his WBO interim title against southpaw contender Zhang Zhilei at the Copper Box Arena in London, England on 15 April 2023.

Professional boxing record

References

External links 
 
 
 
 
Joe Joyce - Profile, News Archive & Current Rankings at Box.Live

|-

1985 births
Living people
English male boxers
Boxers from Greater London
English people of Nigerian descent
English people of Irish descent
Black British sportspeople
Heavyweight boxers
Super-heavyweight boxers
Boxers at the 2014 Commonwealth Games
Commonwealth Games gold medallists for England
Commonwealth Games medallists in boxing
Boxers at the 2015 European Games
European Games gold medalists for Great Britain
European Games medalists in boxing
Boxers at the 2016 Summer Olympics
Olympic boxers of Great Britain
Medalists at the 2016 Summer Olympics
Olympic medalists in boxing
English Olympic medallists
Olympic silver medallists for Great Britain
AIBA World Boxing Championships medalists
England Boxing champions
British Boxing Board of Control champions
European Boxing Union champions
Commonwealth Boxing Council champions
Medallists at the 2014 Commonwealth Games